The Institute of Bioinformatics, often referred to as IOB, is a premier Indian not-for-profit academic research organization based in Bangalore, India. This organization is specially involved in research in the fields of bioinformatics, multi-omics, systems biology and neurological disorders. In 2002, the institute was set up by The Genomics Research Trust and the Johns Hopkins University of Baltimore, Maryland. Currently it is recognized as a 'Scientific and Industrial Research Organization' (SIRO) of the Department of Scientific and Industrial Research (DSIR) of the Government of India.

Databases developed by IOB
 Human Protein Reference Database (in collaboration with the Pandey Lab, Johns Hopkins University)
 Human Proteinpedia
 NetPath
 India Cancer Research Database
 Human Proteome Map
 Plasma Proteome Database
 Pancreatic Cancer Database
 Resource of Asian Primary Immunodeficiency Diseases

Funding Agencies
IOB is funded by various national and international funding agencis.

National funding agencies
 Council of Scientific and Industrial Research
 University Grants Commission (India)
 Indian Council of Medical Research
 Department of Biotechnology
 Department of Science and Technology (India)

International funding agencies
 Human Proteome Organization

Others
  Wellcome Trust/DBT India Alliance

Affiliation
IOB is currently affiliated to Manipal Academy of Higher Education and Amrita Vishwa Vidyapeetham for the award of Ph.D. degrees.

Achievements and global recognition
IOB is the first research institute globally which has been successfully able to decipher a nearly complete protein map of human beings. In May 2014, the journal  Nature published their volume putting this achievement of IOB with title 'The Human Proteome' in their cover. On February 17, 2016, the Government of India's  Department of Science and Technology (DST) released "India's Research Landscape: Output, Collaboration, and Comparative Performance - Bibliometric Studies," which included two reports. The first report, titled "India's Research Output and Collaboration (2005-14): A Bibliometric Study," was compiled by Thomson Reuters, while the second report, titled "International Comparative Performance of India's Research Base (2009-14)," was independently compiled by Elsevier. According to Thomson Reuters, the paper "Human Protein Reference Database," published in 2009, was ranked second among the top 10 Publications with Indian Affiliation in the field of Biology and Biochemistry, and "A draft map of human proteome," featured on the cover of Nature in 2014, was found to be cited more than 400 times in a short period of time and was ranked sixth.

References

Research organizations
Organisations based in India